The 2022 United States Tri-Nation Series was the 13th round of the 2019–2023 ICC Cricket World Cup League 2 cricket tournament that took place in the United States in June 2022. It was a tri-nation series between Nepal, Oman and the United States cricket teams, with the matches played as One Day International (ODI) fixtures. The ICC Cricket World Cup League 2 forms part of the qualification pathway to the 2023 Cricket World Cup. In April 2022, USA Cricket confirmed all the fixtures for the series, with all the matches taking place at the Moosa Stadium in Pearland.

The third ODI match of the series, between the United States and Nepal, finished as a tie.

Squads

Jaskaran Malhotra was ruled out of the USA's squad after suffering a fracture in his hand, with Saiteja Mukkamalla named as his replacement. Subash Khakurel was added to the Nepal squad after Kushal Bhurtel and Aasif Sheikh both suffered injuries that left them doubtful for their opening game of the series.

Fixtures

1st ODI

2nd ODI

3rd ODI

4th ODI

5th ODI

6th ODI

References

External links
 Series home at ESPN Cricinfo

2022 in Nepalese cricket
2022 in American cricket
2022 in Omani cricket
International cricket competitions in 2022
United States
United States Tri-Nation Series